The Lion's Mouth is a 2000 film directed by Ken Russell. It was known as Leonmania.

Russell made it in his own house for his own money for a budget of 20,000 pounds. It launched Russell on a series of self financed "underground" films, a return to the sort of movies he made at the start of his career.

During the making of the film Russell said "I haven't enjoyed the experience of making a film since Amelia and the Angel. Everything in between had its ups and downs, but somehow I think this is really me, this film... I'm totally responsible for it and I didn't want to do it any other way."

Plot
The film was inspired by the Reverend Harold Davidson, the Rector of Stiffkey, a rector in the 1930s who helped prostitutes.

Cast
Diana Laurie as Josephine Heatherington
Ken Russell as Ken the Clown
Tulip Junkie as Nippy / Lion
Emma Millions as Tart / Androcles
Nipper as The dog

Production
When no actor seemed suitable for the role of the vicar, Russell decided to change the film to be a Citizen Kane style investigation of a journalist into the history of the vicar.

References

External links

Lion's Mouth at Letterbox DVD

2000 films
Films directed by Ken Russell
British short films
2000s English-language films